Fight or Flight was an American rock band started by Disturbed members Dan Donegan and Mike Wengren. The band's members consisted of guitarists Dan Donegan and Jeremy Jayson, vocalist Dan Chandler, bassist Sean Corcoran, and drummer Mike Wengren. Fight or Flight released their debut single, First of the Last, on May 21, 2013. Their debut album, titled A Life by Design?, was released on July 23, 2013. via Warner Bros. Records.

History

2011-2013: Formation 
In 2011, when Dan Donegan's and Mike Wengren's band Disturbed was on hiatus, Dan began to intensely miss touring and recording. He began writing songs on his own and later reached out to Evans Blue's lead vocalist, Dan Chandler, in an attempt to collaborate. When the two had enough material to record, Donegan approached Wengren about forming a side project. The three entered the recording studio to put together some songs.

To complete the Fight or Flight lineup, Ra’s Sean Corcoran joined the project to play bass and back vocals. In addition, Bellevue Suite's Jeremy Jayson joined to play guitar and back vocals, completing the band. They signed with Warner Bros. Records in 2013. As Fight or Flight began as a side project, the band members quickly began to experiment with different acoustic guitars and electronics.

2013: A Life by Design? 

After signing a deal with Warner Bros. Records in 2013, the band released their debut single "First of the Last". The single began receiving radio airplay on May 21, 2013.
On May 7, 2013, Fight or Flight's debut album, A Life by Design?, was made available for pre-order on iTunes, including a download for the band's debut single. A Life by Design? was officially released on July 23, 2013 via Warner Bros. Records.

Band members
Dan Donegan – lead guitar
Dan Chandler – lead vocals
Mike Wengren – drums
Sean Corcoran – bass
Jeremy Jayson – rhythm guitar, backing vocals

Discography

Studio albums 
 A Life by Design? (2013)

Singles

Music videos 
 First of the Last (2013)

References

External links 
 

Warner Records artists
American hard rock musical groups
Musical groups established in 2013
2013 establishments in the United States